Tingog Sinirangan, also known as the Tingog Party List is a political organization with party-list representation in the House of Representatives of the Philippines.

Background
Tingog was established on October 2, 2012, as Tingog Leytehon, a provincial political party based in Leyte province. The first chairman of Tingog was Leyte Governor Edgardo Enerlan and Leyte congressman Martin Romualdez. It was accredited on August 19, 2015, by the Commission on Elections as a  party-list organization making it eligible to seek party-list representation in the  House of Representatives as early as the 2016 elections.

The Tingog Party List aims to represent the interest of Eastern Visayans. Although it bills itself as an organization which provides a "regional perspective on national issues". It focuses on issues affecting the countryside or rural areas in general. "Tingog" came from the Waray word for "voice".

Tingog fielded Yedda Marie Romualdez, Jude Acidre, Jaime Go, Alexis V. Yu, and Jennifer Padual as its nominees for the 2019 elections. The organization only secured one seat which was filled in by Yedda Marie Romualdez. She is not a newcomer, having been Leyte's 1st district representative of the then just-concluded 17th Congress. During the 18th Congress, the Alternative Learning System Act was passed into law. The corresponding bill in the House of Representative, had Romualdez as one of its principal authors and the measure was considered a priority by Tingog.

Tingog took part in the 2022 elections with Romualdez, Acidre, and Karla Estrada, Go, and Yu as its nominees. Tingog is projected to gain an additional seat.

Electoral performance

Representatives to Congress

References

Party-lists represented in the House of Representatives of the Philippines
2012 establishments in the Philippines
Regionalist parties in the Philippines
Politics of Eastern Visayas
Politics of Leyte (province)